The Idler is a bi-monthly magazine, devoted to its ethos of 'idling'. Founded in 1993 by Tom Hodgkinson and Gavin Pretor-Pinney, the publication's intention is to return dignity to the art of loafing, to make idling into something to aspire towards rather than reject.

The magazine combines the aesthetics of 1990s slacker culture and pre-industrial revolution idealism. The title comes from a series of essays by Samuel Johnson, published in 1758–59.

Ethos
On the practice of idling, Tom Hodgkinson writes:

History
The Idler was launched in 1993 when its editor, Tom Hodgkinson, was 25. The title came from a series of essays by Samuel Johnson. In it, Johnson wrote on such subjects as sleep and sloth and said: "Every man is, or hopes to be, an idler." The new Idler took this 18th-century sensibility and combined it with the radical philosophies of the 1990s. Issue One featured a profile of Johnson and an interview with psychonaut Terence McKenna.

The Idler has since enjoyed a number of incarnations. In the 1990s it was published by The Guardian newspaper, then by Ebury publishing. Hodgkinson published the Idler as an annual collection of essays until 2014, then relaunched the magazine in 2016. The magazine is now published bi-monthly.

Spin-offs and other media
Tom Hodgkinson has written numerous books which develop this attitude to life. The first, How to Be Idle, has been published in 20 countries and has so far become a best-seller in the UK, Italy and Germany. His second book How to Be Free takes an anarchic approach to the everyday barriers that come between us and our dreams. The third is an alternative parenting manual, The Idle Parent, which argues that children should be left largely to their own devices. The fourth, Brave Old World considers the virtues of the self-sufficient, rural lifestyle.

The Crap series of humour books is a direct spin-off from an Idler column and edited by Dan Kieran:

 Crap Jobs is a series of books chronicling the worst of Idler-readers' forays into employment.
 Crap Towns exposes some of the worst places to live in Great Britain. Crap Towns caught the public imagination but drew fire from both local councils and local media in those areas concerned.
 Crap Holidays is an exploration of Samuel Johnson's maxim that the idler allows events and goods to come to him rather than expend energy and money travelling to disenchanting locations.

The Idler includes archived magazine content and regular updates from the editor.

Academy
The Idler Academy, founded at a festival in 2010, is the Idlers educational offshoot. It is a school which offers online and real-world courses in the classical liberal arts and practical skills. The Idler Academy teaches philosophy, astronomy, calligraphy, music, business skills, English grammar, ukulele, public speaking, singing, drawing, self-defence and other subjects.

Bad Grammar Award
From 2013 the Academy awarded a Bad Grammar Award. Entries were nominated by Idler readers and Academy students and judged by a panel of experts.Winners'''

2018: The NHS

2017: Transport For London

Notable past contributors
Contributors and interviewees who have been featured in the Idler include:

Dan Kieran, Deputy Editor – author
Adam Buxton, Comedian and writer
Jonathan Ross – TV presenter
Louis Theroux – TV presenter
Damien Hirst – artist
Fiona Russell Powell – writer and former ABC band member
Tony Barrell – Journalist who also writes for The Sunday Times (UK)Joanna Blythman – food activist
Raoul Vaneigem – Situationist theorist
Chris Donald – Viz comic founder
Jay Griffiths – author
Penny Rimbaud – former Crass drummer and spokesperson
Chris Yates – angler and tea enthusiast

Pete Doherty – member of The Libertines and Babyshambles
Bill Oddie – comedian and wildlife expert
Nicholas Blincoe – British novelist
Alex James – of Blur
Patrick Moore – astronomer
Mark Manning – formerly of Zodiac Mindwarp and the Love Reaction
Bill Drummond – of The KLF
Ben Moor – writer and actor
Tony White – writer and Idler literary editor
Alain de Botton – philosophy writer
Adam and Joe – comedy performers
Matt Bullen – writer and polyamory advocate
Ian Bone – founder of Class War newspaper

Current columnists and regulars

 Tom Hodgkinson, founder and editor
 Bill Anderson, beekeeping column
 Graham Burnett, gardening column
 Geraldine Coats, gin column
 Will Hodgkinson, music
 Virginia Ironside, agony aunt
 Victoria Hull, food and dining

 Robert Katz, astronomy column
 "Evil Gordon", beer column
 Alex Johnson, snooker column
 Michael Palin, humorous column
 Andrew Smart, science and news
 Gustav Temple, fashion and style
 Robert Wringham, escape column

See also
 Flâneur''
 New Escapologist
 Refusal of work

References

External links
 Official website
 Editor's interview with 3:AM Magazine
 Sleepyville, an unofficial forum and resource site about idling, which appeared after the Idle Foundation closed down.

Annual magazines published in the United Kingdom
Bi-monthly magazines published in the United Kingdom
Criticism of work
Magazines established in 1993
Magazines published in London
Utopian movements
Works about labor
Visual arts magazines published in the United Kingdom